Roy Thomas "Peaches" Davis (May 31, 1905 – April 28, 1995) was an American Major League Baseball (MLB) pitcher from 1936 to 1939. He played for the Cincinnati Reds.

Davis began his professional baseball career with the Class A Topeka Jayhawks of the Western League in 1929. After seven years of minor league baseball, he made his MLB debut with the Reds on July 11, 1936. His final game with the Reds came on August 17, 1939. He returned to minor league baseball for the 1940–42 and 1945 seasons.

Born in Glen Rose, Texas, Davis died in Duncan, Oklahoma, a month short of his 90th birthday.

References

External links

1905 births
1995 deaths
Major League Baseball pitchers
Cincinnati Reds players
People from Glen Rose, Texas
Nashville Vols players